The staircase maneuver (or staircase movement) is a tactical motif that employs the idea of a series of checks, or alternation between pins and checks, to advance a queen, rook, or king along a diagonal via a series of stepped orthogonal moves.

Examples
Staircase maneuvers tend to occur in queen and pawn endgames, where the defender has advanced pawns on the seventh . Here the attacking queen alternates between black and white squares giving pins and checks until it reaches an open file to deliver the final mate.

In the diagram, if Black's pawn on b2 had already  on b1, the game would be drawn. White mates in 12, however, using the staircase maneuver: 
1.Qc3 Kb1 2.Qd3+ Ka1 3.Qd4 Kb1 4.Qe4+ Ka1 5.Qe5 Kb1 6.Qf5+ Ka1 7.Qf6 Kb1 8.Qg6+ Ka1 9.Qg7 Kb1 10.Qh7+ Ka1 11.Qh8 Kb1 12.Qh1

In the game Tarrasch–Alekhine, Piešt'any 1922, after 33...Be6 (first diagram), if play had continued instead 34.Qc6 Rf3 35.Qxe4 Bd5 36.Qa4 Qxg2+ 37.Kxg2 (second diagram), a staircase maneuver resulting in mate is possible: 
37...Rg3+ 38.Kh2 Rg2+ 39.Kh1 Rh2+ 40.Kg1 Rh1#

See also
Chess tactics
Windmill

References

Bibliography

Chess tactics